Ibsen is a crater on Mercury. It is located near the antipode of the Caloris Basin.  Its name was approved by the IAU in 1976.

References

Impact craters on Mercury
Henrik Ibsen